This is a list of prominent people who were born in the state of Rhode Island or who spent significant periods of their lives in the state.

Academia

 James Burrill Angell (1829–1916) – educator, academic administrator, and diplomat
 Glen Bowersock (born 1936) – scholar of the ancient world and the history of ancient Greece, Rome, and the Near East
 David Carlin (born 1938) – professor of sociology and philosophy at Community College of Rhode Island
 Robert Carothers (born 1942) – president of the University of Rhode Island
 Ronald Champagne – president of Elmira College, Merrimack College, and Shimer College
 Sarah Doyle (1830–1922) – educator and reformer
 Paula Fredriksen (born 1951) – historian and scholar of religious studies
 Henry Giroux (born 1943) – radical educator and cultural critic
 Neil Lanctot (born 1966) – historian
 Francis Leo Lawrence (1937–2013) – educator, scholar of French literature, and university administrator
 Edward T. Lewis (also known as Ted Lewis) – president of St. Mary's College of Maryland, president of the Pennsylvania Academy of Fine Arts, writer, and poet 
 Helen Adelia Rowe Metcalf (1830–1895) – founder and director of the Rhode Island School of Design
 Barry Mills (born 1950) – fourteenth president of Bowdoin College
 Salvatore D. Morgera (born 1946) – Professor of Electrical Engineering at University of South Florida
 Wilfred Harold Munro (1849–1934) – historian
 Richard Vangermeersch (born 1940) – economist, Emeritus Professor of Accounting at the University of Rhode Island
 Minton Warren (1850–1907) – classical scholar

Activism, civil rights, and philanthropy

 Susan Hammond Barney (1834-1922) — social activist
 Zechariah Chafee (1885–1957) – judicial philosopher, civil rights advocate
 Elizabeth Buffum Chace (1806–1899) – activist in the anti-slavery, women's-rights, and prison-reform movements of the mid-to-late 19th century
 Cornelia Bryce Pinchot (1881–1960) – Newport native who became a conservationist, Progressive politician, women's rights activist, and First Lady of Pennsylvania
 Abby Aldrich Rockefeller (1874–1948) – philanthropist
 Robert Ellis Smith (1940–2018) – publisher and consumer activist, Privacy Journal; civil rights journalist in Alabama
 Marjorie van Vliet (1923–1990) – teacher and aviator

Art, literature, and design

 Jacob M. Appel (born 1973) – novelist
 John Noble Barlow (1861–1917) – painter
 Lee Bontecou (born 1931) – sculptor and printmaker
 Mary Hannah Gray Clarke (1835-1892) — author, correspondent, and poet 
 George M. Cohan (1878–1942) – playwright, composer, and vaudeville performer
 Paul Di Filippo (born 1954) – science fiction author and critic
 Denise Duhamel (born 1961) – poet
 Judith Dupré – author
 C. M. Eddy Jr. (1896–1967) – author
 Jeanpaul Ferro – poet, short fiction author, novelist
 F. Burge Griswold (1826–1900) — author
 John Hawkes (1925–1998) – novelist
 Greta Hodgkinson – ballet dancer
 Ann Hood (born 1956) – novelist and short story writer
 Raymond Mathewson Hood (1881–1934) – architect
 Galway Kinnell – poet
 Eleanor Kirk (1831–1908) — author, publisher
 Christopher La Farge –novelist and poet
 Jhumpa Lahiri – Pulitzer Prize-author
 H. P. Lovecraft (1890–1937) – author
 Maxwell Mays (1918–2009) – painter
 David Macaulay (born 1946) – author
 Cormac McCarthy (born 1933) – novelist
 Don McGregor (born 1945) – comic book writer
 Edwin O'Connor (1918–1968) – novelist
 S.J. Perelman (1904–1979) – humorist, critic
 Peter Pezzelli (born 1959) – author
 David Plante (born 1940) – novelist
 George Schuyler (1895–1977) – author
 Bert Shurtleff (1897–1967) – author
 Gilbert Stuart (1755–1828) – painter
 Philemon Sturges (1929–2005) – architect and children's author
 Cynthia Taggart (1801–1849) — poet
 Thomas Alexander Tefft (1826–1859) – architect
 Don Winslow (born 1953) – author

Athletics

A–G

 Lou Abbruzzi (1917–1982) – football player
 Pat Abbruzzi (1932–1998) – football player
 Noel Acciari (born 1991) – ice hockey player
 Gary Albright (1963–2000) – wrestler
 Bill Almon (born 1952) – baseball player
 Deon Anderson (born 1983) – football player
 Billy Andrade (born 1964) – golfer
 Demetrius Andrade (born 1988) – boxer
 Earl Audet (1921–2002) – football player
 Rocco Baldelli (born 1981) – baseball player, manager
 Marvin Barnes (1952–2014) – basketball player
 Elizabeth Beisel (born 1992) – Olympic swimmer (2008, 2012)
 Jeff Beliveau (born 1987) – baseball player
 Curt Bennett (born 1948) – ice hockey player 
 Harvey Bennett (born 1952) – ice hockey player
 John Bennett (born 1950) – ice hockey player
 Bryan Berard (born 1977) – ice hockey player
 Will Blackmon (born 1984) – football player
 Brian Boucher (born 1977) – ice hockey player
 Pedro Braz (born 1985) – soccer player
 Paul Briggs (1920–2011) – football player
 Ellison "Tarzan" Brown (1914–1975) – two-time Boston Marathon champion and U.S. Olympian
 Brian Burke (born 1955) – ice hockey executive
 Ernie Calverley (1924–2003) – basketball player
 Dave Capuano (born 1968) – ice hockey player
 Jack Capuano (born 1966) – ice hockey player, head coach
 Keith Carney (born 1970) – ice hockey player and U.S. Olympian (1998)
 Marissa Castelli (born 1990) – Olympic pairs figure skater (2014)
 Tom Cavanagh (1982–2011) – hockey player
 Malcolm Chance (1875–1955) – Hall of Fame tennis player
 Mike Cloud (born 1975) – football player
 Fred Corey (1855–1912) – baseball player
 Miguel Cotto (born 1980) – boxer
 Jill Craybas (born 1974) – tennis player
 Sara DeCosta (born 1977) – Olympic ice hockey champion and silver medalist (1998, 2002)
 Al Del Greco (born 1962) – football player, radio personality
 Ernie DiGregorio (born 1951) – basketball player
 Clark Donatelli (born 1967) – ice hockey player and U.S. Olympian (1988, 1992)
 Allen Doyle (born 1948) – golfer
 Pat Duff (1875–1925) – baseball player
 Anthony Durante (1967–2003) – professional wrestler
 Joe Exter (born 1978) – ice hockey player
 Brad Faxon (born 1961) – golfer
 Claire Waters Ferguson (born 1936) – ice skating executive
 Melissa Fiorentino (born 1977) – boxer
 Steve Furness (1950–2000) – football player, coach
 Tom Garrick (born 1966) – basketball player
 Rob Gaudreau (born 1970) – ice hockey player
 Dave Gavitt (1937–2011) – basketball coach
 Billy Gonsalves (1908–1977) – soccer player
 Lou Gorman (1929–2011) – baseball executive
 Paul Guay (born 1963) – ice hockey player

H–Z

 Gabby Hartnett (1900–1972) – baseball player
 Joe Hassett (born 1955) – basketball player
 Tom Healey (1853–1891) – baseball player
 Anne Hird (born 1959) — pioneering marathon runner
 P. H. Horgan III (born 1960) – golfer
 Tony Horton (born 1958) – physical fitness expert
 Robert Howard (1975–2004) – 1996 and 2000 U.S. Olympic Track & Field Team
 John Hynes (born 1975) – ice hockey head coach
 Matt Hyson (born 1970) – wrestler
 Chris Iannetta (born 1983) – baseball player
 Drew Inzer (born 1979) – football player
 Jeff Jillson (born 1980) – ice hockey player
 Steven King (born 1969) – ice hockey player
 Paul Konerko (born 1976) – baseball player
 Clem Labine (1926–2007) – baseball player
 Nap Lajoie (1874–1959) – Hall of Fame baseball player
 Clara LaMore (1926–2021) – International Swimming Hall of Fame inductee
 Lou Lamoriello (born 1942) – ice hockey executive
 Rick Lancellotti (born 1956) – baseball player
 John LaRose (1951–2021) – baseball player
 Brian Lawton (born 1965) – hockey player
 Ricky Ledo (born 1992) – basketball player
 Ed Lee (born 1961) – ice hockey player
 David Littman (born 1967) – ice hockey player 
 Davey Lopes (born 1945) – baseball player and coach
 Peter Manfredo (born 1980) – boxer
 Ken McDonald (born 1970) – basketball player, coach
 John Mellekas (1933–2015) – football player
 Tom Mellor (born 1950) – hockey player and U.S. Olympian (1972)
 Ray Monaco (1918–2002) – football player
 Chet Nichols Jr. (1931–1995) – baseball player
 Bill Osmanski (1915–1996) – College Football Hall of Fame inductee
 Chuck Palumbo (born 1971) – wrestler
 Don Panciera (1927–2012) – football player
 Les Pawson (1905–1992) – two-time Boston Marathon winner
 Vinny Paz (born 1962) – boxer, five-time world champion
 Gerry Philbin (born 1941) – football player
 David Quinn (born 1966) – ice hockey player
 Joe Reed (born 1948) – football player
 Aileen Riggin (1906–2002) – swimmer
 Bill Sandeman (born 1942) – football player
 Mathieu Schneider (born 1969) – professional ice hockey player
 Bobby Sewall (born 1988) – football player
 Bert Shurtleff (1897–1967) – football player
 Jamie Silva (born 1984) – football player
 Jim Siwy (born 1958) – baseball player
 A.J. Smith (born 1949) – football executive
 Hank Soar (1914–2001) – football player
 Joe Soares – rugby player
 Sean Soriano – mixed martial artist
 Andre Soukhamthath – mixed martial artist
 Mike Stefanik (1958–2019) – NASCAR driver
 Bill Summers (1895–1966) – Major League Baseball umpire
 Chris Terreri (born 1964) – NHL goalie, two Stanley Cups and U.S. Olympian (1988)
 Mark Van Eeghen (born 1952) – NFL Pro Bowl running back
 Dan Wheeler (born 1977) – baseball player
 Cody Wild (born 1987) – ice hockey player
 Mason Williams (born 1991) – baseball player
 Ron Wilson (born 1955) – ice hockey player, head coach
 Jeff Xavier (born 1985) – basketball player

Business

 Zachariah Allen (1795–1882) – textile manufacturer, scientist, lawyer, writer, inventor and civil leader
 Everett M. "Busy" Arnold (1899–1974) – comic book publisher
 F. Nelson Blount (1918–1967) – industrialist and railroad enthusiast, founder of the Blount Seafood Corporation and Steamtown, USA
 John Brown (1736–1803) – merchant and slave-trader, original owner of the John Brown House, co-founder of the College in the English Colony of Rhode Island and Providence Plantations (Brown University)
 Moses Brown (1738–1836) – co-founder of the College in the English Colony of Rhode Island and Providence Plantations (Brown University)
 Nicholas Brown Jr. (1769–1841) – businessman and philanthropist for whom Brown University is named
 Robert Crandall (born 1935) – former president and chairman of American Airlines
 Glenn Creamer – senior managing director of Providence Equity Partners
 Marcel Desaulniers (born 1945) – chef and director emeritus of the Culinary Institute of America
 Wylie Dufresne (born 1970) – celebrity chef, owner of wd~50 restaurant in Manhattan
 Ann Smith Franklin (1696–1763) – publisher
 Darius Goff (1809–1891) – Pawtucket textile mill owner
 Catherine Littlefield Greene (1755–1814) – wife of Nathanael Greene
 Daniel Harple (born 1959) – entrepreneur, investor, inventor
 Bradley S. Jacobs (born 1956) – chairman and chief executive officer of XPO Logistics
 Laura Lang – former chief executive officer of Time Inc.
 Aaron Lopez (1731–1782) – slave merchant and philanthropist, wealthiest person in Newport
 Edward J. McElroy (born 1941) – labor union executive
 James McNerney (born 1949) – business executive
 David Nason (born 1970) – president and CEO of GE Energy Financial Services
 Jonathan M. Nelson (born 1956) – businessman and investor, founder of Providence Equity Partners
 Carolyn Rafaelian – designer, philanthropist, and business woman, founder of Alex and Ani
 Samuel Slater (1768–1835) – industrialist, "father of the industrial revolution"
 Henry J. Steere (1830–1889) – textile industrialist, philanthropist
 Judah Touro (1775–1854) – businessman
 William Kissam Vanderbilt (1849–1920) – member of the prominent American Vanderbilt family, original owner of Marble House in Newport
 William Vernon (1719–1806) – trader

Crime

 Thomas Tew (?–1695) – pirate

Film and television

A–L

 Norm Abram (born 1950) – carpenter and television performer
 Robert Aldrich (1918–1983) – film director
 Gianna Amore (born 1968) – model and actress
 Harry Anderson (1952–2018) – actor, Night Court
 David Angell (1946–2001) – television producer
 Nadia Bjorlin (born 1980) – actress
 Billy Bush (born 1971) – radio and TV host, Access Hollywood, Today
 Ruth Buzzi (born 1936) – comedian, Laugh-In
 Sean Callery (born 1964) – film and television composer
 Robert Capron (born 1998) – actor
 Marilyn Chambers (1952–2009) – pornographic film actress
 Harry Cicma (born 1982) – Emmy Award-winning sports anchor, professional tennis player
 Amanda Clayton (born 1981) – actress, City on a Hill
 Nicholas Colasanto (1924–1985) – actor and director, Cheers
 Michael Corrente (born 1959) – film director and producer
 Olivia Culpo (born 1992) – Miss Rhode Island USA 2012, Miss USA 2012, Miss Universe 2012
 Sam Daly (born 1984) – actor
 Viola Davis (born 1965) – Academy Award-winning actress
 Charlie Day (born 1976) – actor, It's Always Sunny in Philadelphia
 Vin Di Bona (born 1944) – television producer
 Eddie Dowling (1895–1976) – actor
 Alice Drummond (1929–2016) – actress
 Jack Duffy (1882–1939) – film actor
 Nelson Eddy (1901–1967) – actor and singer
 Susan Eisenberg (born 1964) – voice actress
 Mark Famiglietti (born 1979) – actor
 Bobby Farrelly (born 1958) – film director
 Peter Farrelly (born 1956) – film director
 Mat Franco (born 1988) – magician, America's Got Talent winner
 Matt Fraser (born 1991) – psychic and television personality
 Peter Frechette (born 1956) – actor
 Peter Gerety (born 1940) – actor
 Joanna Going (born 1963) – actress
 Spalding Gray (1941–2004) – actor and writer
 Richard Hart (1915–1951) – actor
 Elisabeth Hasselbeck (born 1977) – television personality
 Sam Hyde – comedian
 Richard Hatch (born 1961) – reality television contestant
 Jason Hawes (born 1971) – television actor
 David Hedison (1927–2019) – actor
 Brian Helgeland (born 1961) – screenwriter, film producer and director
 Ruth Hussey (1911–2005) – Academy Award-nominated actress
 Thomas Harper Ince (1882–1924) – film producer, director, actor
 Richard Jenkins (born 1947) – Academy Award-nominated actor
 Joyce Jillson (1946–2004) – actress, author, and astrologer
 Van Johnson (1916–2008) – actor, The Caine Mutiny, Brigadoon
 Claudia Jordan (born 1973) – Miss Rhode Island Teen USA 1997
 Ted Knight (1923–1986) – actor, The Mary Tyler Moore Show, Caddyshack
 Geoffrey Lewis (1935–2015) – actor
 Eric Lutes (born 1962) – actor

M–Z

 Seth MacFarlane (born 1973) – voice actor, creator of Family Guy, American Dad!, The Cleveland Show, and Ted
 George Macready (1899–1973) – actor
 Mike Maronna (born 1977) – actor
 Jason Marsden (born 1975) – actor
 Louis B. Mayer (1884–1957) – film producer and MGM studio mogul
 Matt McCarthy (born 1979) – comedian, actor
 Ron McLarty (1947–2020) – actor, playwright, novelist
 Michaela McManus (born 1983) – actress, Law & Order: SVU, One Tree Hill
 Caroline McWilliams (1945–2010) – actress
 Debra Messing (born 1968) – actress, Will and Grace
 Shanna Moakler (born 1975) – Miss Rhode Island Teen USA 1992, Miss New York USA 1995, Miss USA 1995
 Mark Morettini (born 1962) – actor, Prison Break
 Christopher Murney (born 1943) – actor
 Arden Myrin (born 1973) – actress
 Brendan O'Malley (born 1969) – actor and writer
 Vincent Pagano (born 1967) – actor
 Pauly D (born 1980) – television personality, DJ, cast member of Jersey Shore
 David Petrarca (born 1962) – film, television and theatre director
 Ben Powers (1950–2015) – actor, Rowan & Martin's Laugh-In
 Ford Rainey (1908–2005) – actor
 Don Reo – television producer
 Kali Rocha (born 1971) – actress
 Charles Rocket (1945–2005) – actor
 Josh Schwartz (born 1976) – television producer
 Dave Shalansky (born 1973) – actor
 Chris Sparling (born 1977) – screenwriter and director
 Christopher Stanley (born 1965) – actor, Henry Francis on Mad Men
 Mena Suvari (born 1979) – actress, American Beauty
 Aimee Sweet (born 1977) – model and actress
 Saucy Sylvia (1921–2017) – comedian, singer, radio personality
 Erika Van Pelt – American Idol finalist
 Meredith Vieira (born 1953) – television personality
 David S. Ward (born 1945) – film director, Academy Award-winning screenwriter (The Sting)
 Desiree Washington (born 1973) – model
 James Woods (born 1947) – Academy Award-nominated actor

Journalism

 Allen Bestwick (born 1961) – sportscaster
 Angelo Cataldi – sportscaster
 David Hartman (born 1935) – actor, television personality
 Irving R. Levine (1922–2009) – journalist
 Walter Mossberg (born 1947) – columnist
 Al Rockoff – photographer
 George Schuyler (1895–1977) – author, journalist
 A. O. Scott (born 1966) – film critic
 Jeff Stein (born 1944) – columnist, blogger
 Doug White (1944–2006) – television newscaster
 Jack White (1942–2005) – journalist

Military

 William Henry Allen (1784–1813) – Navy officer
 John Nicholas Brown II (1900–1979) – United States Assistant Secretary of the Navy (AIR)
 Ambrose Burnside (1824–1881) – Army officer
 Stephen Champlin (1789–1870) – Navy officer
 Godfrey Chevalier (1889–1922) – Navy officer
 Nathanael Greene (1742–1786) – Continental Army officer, considered George Washington's most gifted officer
 Esek Hopkins (1718–1802) – Commander in Chief of the Continental Navy during the American Revolutionary War
 Leon J. LaPorte (born 1946) – Army officer, former U.S. Forces Korea commander
George Luz (1921–1998) –- member of famed Easy Company 506th, 101st.
 Matthew C. Perry (1794–1858) – Navy officer
 Oliver Hazard Perry (1785–1819) – Navy officer
 Elisha Hunt Rhodes (1842–1917) – Army
 Isaac P. Rodman (1822–1862) – Army officer
 James Mitchell Varnum (1748–1789) – general in the Continental Army during the American Revolutionary War
 Samuel Ward Jr. (1756–1832) – American Revolutionary War soldier and delegate to the secessionist Hartford Convention
 Frank Wheaton (1833–1903) – Army officer
 Abraham Whipple (1733–1819) – Continental Navy commander-in-chief
 David B. Champagne (1932-1952) – Medal of Honor recipient

Music

 Greg Abate (born 1947) – jazz musician
 Stevie Aiello (born 1983) – founding member of Monty Are I, and touring musician with Thirty Seconds to Mars
 AraabMuzik (born 1989) – record producer and DJ
 Dicky Barrett (born 1964) – popular musician, frontman of The Mighty Mighty Bosstones, announcer for Jimmy Kimmel Live!
 David Blue (1941–1982) – singer-songwriter
 John Cafferty – musician known for work with The Beaver Brown Band and for the Eddie and the Cruisers soundtrack
 Blu Cantrell (born 1976) – musician
 Wendy Carlos (born 1939) – composer and electronic music pioneer
 George M. Cohan (1878–1942) – entertainer, singer, dancer, subject of the film, Yankee Doodle Dandy
 Bill Conti (born 1942) – film music composer, Rocky
 Bill Cowsill (1948–2006) – musician
 Tanya Donelly (born 1966) – musician
 John Dwyer (born 1974) – multi-instrumentalist, vocalist, songwriter, visual artist, and record label owner
 Eileen Farrell (1920–2002) – opera singer
 Sage Francis (born 1976) – musician
 Billy Gilman (born 1988) – musician
 Al Gomes (born 1960) – record producer and songwriter
 Lukasz Gottwald (born 1973) – songwriter
 Bobby Hackett (1915–1976) – jazz musician
 Scott Hamilton (born 1954) – jazz tenor saxophonist
 Kristin Hersh (born 1966) – musician
 Jon B. (born 1974) – musician
 Jesse Leach (born 1978) – popular musician
 Mapei (born 1983) – recording artist
 Alexis S.F. Marshall – vocalist for the experimental rock band Daughters
 Dave McKenna (1930–2008) – jazz pianist
 Paul Motian (1931–2011) – jazz drummer, composer, bandleader
 Nico Muhly (born 1981) – contemporary classical music composer 
 David Narcizo (born 1966) – musician
 David Olney (1948–2020) – musician
 Jeffrey Osborne (born 1948) – musician
 Mike Renzi (born 1946) – pianist
 Duke Robillard (born 1948) – blues musician
 Kim Schifino – musician
 Carol Sloane (born 1937) – jazz singer
 Mike Stud (born 1988) – rapper, former athlete
 Erika Van Pelt (born 1985) – singer 
 Leon Wilkeson (1952–2001) – bassist for Lynyrd Skynyrd
 Don Wise (born 1942) – tenor saxophonist, music producer, songwriter
 Arizona Zervas (born 1995) – rapper, composer, singer

Politics and government

A–L

 Lincoln Almond (born 1936) – former governor
 Thomas Angell (1618–1694) – co-founder of the Colony of Rhode Island and Providence Plantations
 Jonathan Earle Arnold (1814–1869) – member of the Wisconsin Territorial Council
 Peleg Arnold (1751–1820) – lawyer, tavern-keeper, jurist, and statesman
 Joshua Babcock (1707–1783) – physician, American Revolution general, state Supreme Court justice, and postmaster
 Latimer Whipple Ballou (1812–1900) – member of the House of Representatives
 Sullivan Ballou (1829–1861) – state representative and Army officer
 Oliver Belmont (1858–1908) – charter member of the Rhode Island Society of Sons of the Revolution, Representative for New York
 Charles R. Brayton (1840–1910) – politician and lobbyist whom The New York Times called the "Blind Boss of Rhode Island"
 Samuel W. Bridgham (1776–1740) – first mayor of Providence
 Frank Caprio (born 1936) – judge and television performer
 John Chafee (1922–1999) – U.S. Senator
 Lincoln Chafee (born 1953) – U.S. Senator, governor of Rhode Island, presidential candidate
 Vincent "Buddy" Cianci Jr. (1941–2016) – former mayor of Providence
 David Cicilline (born 1961) – Representative and Mayor of Providence
 William Coddington (1601–1678) – magistrate of the Colony of Rhode Island and Providence Plantations, Judge of Portsmouth, Judge of Newport, Governor of Portsmouth and Newport, Deputy Governor of the entire colony, and governor of the colony
 Thomas Corcoran (1900–1981) – member of President Franklin Roosevelt's "Brain Trust" during the New Deal and an advisor to President Lyndon B. Johnson
 Percy Daniels (1840–1916) – Populist politician
 Edward D. DiPrete (born 1934) – former governor of Rhode Island
 Thomas Donilon – National Security Adviser under President Barack Obama
 Thomas A. Doyle (1827–1886) – Mayor of Providence for eighteen years
 Job Durfee (1790–1847) – Congressman
 Elisha Dyer Jr. (1839–1906) – 45th Governor of Rhode Island, mayor of Providence
 William Ellery (1727–1820) – a signer of the United States Declaration of Independence as a representative of Rhode Island
 Arthur Fenner (1745–1805) – fourth governor of Rhode Island
 Michael Flynn (born 1958) – retired Army lieutenant general and National Security Advisor
 Theodore Foster (1752–1828) – one of the first two United States senators from Rhode Island
 Samuel Gorton (1593–1677) – settled Warwick
 Daniel L. D. Granger (1852–1909) – Representative and mayor of Providence
 Theodore F. Green (1867–1866) – United States Senator, 57th Governor of Rhode Island, and namesake of T. F. Green Airport
 Christopher R. Hill (born 1952) – diplomat, Assistant Secretary of State for East Asian and Pacific Affairs
 Stephen Hopkins (1707–1785) – Governor of Rhode Island, RI Supreme Court justice, Signatory of the Declaration of Independence
 Joseph B. Keenan – Chief Prosecutor in the International Military Tribunal for the Far East
 Ambrose Kennedy (1875–1967) – Congressman
 Pat LaMarche (born 1960) – Green Party presidential candidate
 William C. Lovering (1835–1910) – Congressman

M–Z

 James McAndrews (1862–1942) – Congressman
 William McCormick (born 1939) – diplomat, United States Ambassador to New Zealand
 J. Howard McGrath (1903–1966) – Governor of Rhode Island, Solicitor General, Senator, chairman of the Democratic National Committee, and Attorney General of the United States
 Edwin D. McGuinness (1856–1901) – first Irish-Catholic mayor of Providence
 Florence K. Murray (1916–2004) – officer in Women's Army Corps, first female state senator in Rhode Island, first female judge in Rhode Island, and first female member of the Rhode Island Supreme Court
 Dee Dee Myers (born 1961) – White House Press Secretary
 Annette Nazareth (born 1956) – commissioner of the Securities and Exchange Commission
 Joseph R. Paolino Jr. – U.S. Ambassador to Malta, former Mayor of Providence
 John O. Pastore (1907–2000) – Governor of Rhode Island, Senator
 Claiborne Pell (1918–2009) – Senator, diplomat, sponsor of Pell grants
 Aram J. Pothier (1854–1928) – Governor of Rhode Island, banker
 Jack Reed (born 1949) – Senator
 Dennis J. Roberts (1903–1994) – 63rd Governor of Rhode Island
 Christopher Robinson (1806–1889) – congressman
 James Y. Smith (1809–1876) – mayor of Providence and 29th Governor of Rhode Island
 Sean Spicer (born 1971) – White House Press Secretary for President Donald Trump
 William Sprague (1799–1856) – 14th Governor, a U.S. Representative, and a Senator
 William H. Sullivan (1922–2013) – U.S. Ambassador
 Bruce Sundlun (1920–2011) – former governor
 Charles Tillinghast James (1805–1862) – U.S. Senator
 Pat Toomey (born 1961) – Senator for Pennsylvania
 Samuel Ward (1725–1776) – RI Supreme Court justice, Governor of the Colony of Rhode Island and Providence Plantations, and a delegate to the Continental Congress
 William West (1733–1816) – American Revolution general, Lieutenant Governor, RI Supreme Court justice, anti-federalist leader
 Sheldon Whitehouse (born 1955) – state Attorney General, Senator
 Charles C. Van Zandt (1830–1894) – former governor

Religion

 Alfred W. Anthony (1860–1939) – author, Free Will Baptist leader, and religion professor at Bates College
 Emeline S. Burlingame (1836-1923) — president, Rhode Island Woman’s Christian Temperance Union; president, Free Baptist Woman‘s Missionary Society
 William Ellery Channing (1780–1842) – Unitarian theologian
 John Clarke (1609–1676) – Baptist minister, co-founder of the Colony of Rhode Island and Providence Plantations, author of its influential charter, and a leading advocate of religious freedom in America
 Maurice Davis (1921–1993) – Rabbi and human-rights activist
 Ernest Fortin (1923–2002) – Assumptionist and professor of theology at Boston College
 Mark Antony De Wolfe Howe (1808–1895) – Episcopal Church bishop
 Anne Hutchinson (1591–1643) – early settler of Newport, catalyst of the Antinomian Controversy
 James Manning (1738–1791) – American Baptist minister, co-founder and first president of the College in the English Colony of Rhode Island and Providence Plantations (Brown University)
 Edwards Amasa Park (1808–1900) – theologian
 Ezra Stiles (1727–1795) – Congregationalist minister and co-founder of the College in the English Colony of Rhode Island and Providence Plantations]]
 Roger Williams (1603–1684) – founder of the Colony of Rhode Island and Providence Plantations, influential author, considered the first proponent of separation of church and state

Science

 Aaron T. Beck (1921-2021) – psychiatrist
 George Brayton (1830–1892) – mechanical engineer
 Joseph Brown (1733–1785) – astronomer
 Rita Charon (born 1949) – physician
 Solomon Drowne (1753–1834) – physician, academic, and surgeon during the American Revolution
 Sylvester Gardiner (1707–1786) – physician
 Stuart Gitlow (born 1962) – psychiatrist
 Frederic Poole Gorham (1871–1933) – bacteriologist
 Nathanael Herreshoff (1848–1938) – naval engineer
 Domina Jalbert (1904–1991) – inventor
 Melanie Sanford (born 1975) – chemist
 Sherwood C. Spring (born 1944) – astronaut
 Robert Henry Thurston (1839–1903) – first president of the ASME
 Frank E. Winsor (1870–1939) – civil engineer

See also

 List of early settlers of Rhode Island
List of Rhode Island suffragists
By educational institution affiliation

 List of Brown University people
 List of Bryant University alumni
 List of Rhode Island School of Design people

By location

 List of people from Cranston, Rhode Island
 List of people from Newport, Rhode Island
 List of people from Pawtucket, Rhode Island
 List of people from Providence, Rhode Island
 List of people from South Kingstown, Rhode Island

References